Mbali may refer to
Mbali language, a minor Bantu language of Angola
Mbali Dhlamini, South African artist
Mbali Mpofu (born 1990), South African water polo player
Mbali Ntuli (born c. 1988), South African politician